Flora Japonica may refer to:
 Flora Japonica (1784 book), a book by Carl Peter Thunberg published in 1784
 Flora Japonica (1834 book), a book by Joseph Gerhard Zuccarini published in 1835

See also 
 Flora of Japan